Máximo Luis Alcócer (15 April 1933 – 13 May 2014) was a Bolivian footballer whose career lasted for almost ten years. His career debut began in 1954. He retired in 1964.

Club career
Alcócer played for Club Union Maestranza, Club Wilstermann and Club Aurora. Alcócer was born in Cochabamba, Bolivia.

International career
With the national team of Bolivia he won the 1963 South American Championship and scored the winning goal versus Brazil in Bolivia's final match of the tournament in Cochabamba. He earned a total of 22 caps, scoring 13 goals.

Personal life

Death
Alcócer died in North Carolina, United States, aged 81.

References

1933 births
2014 deaths
Sportspeople from Cochabamba
Bolivian footballers
Bolivia international footballers
Copa América-winning players
Club Aurora players
C.D. Jorge Wilstermann players
Association football forwards